Van Egmont is a surname. Notable people with the surname include:

Anna van Egmont (1533–1558), Princess of Orange
Floris van Egmont ( 1470–1539), Dutch noble
Justus van Egmont (1602–1674), Dutch painter and tapestry designer

See also
Van Egmond

Surnames of Dutch origin